The 1989–90 United Counties League season was the 83rd in the history of the United Counties League, a football competition in England.

Premier Division

The Premier Division featured 20 clubs which competed in the division last season, along with two new clubs:
Burton Park Wanderers, promoted from Division One
Wellingborough Town, relegated from the Southern Football League

Also, Stewart & Lloyds Corby changed name to Hamlet Stewart & Lloyds.

League table

Division One

Division One featured 18 clubs which competed in the division last season, along with one new club:
Daventry Town, joined from the Northamptonshire Combination League

League table

References

External links
 United Counties League

1989–90 in English football leagues
United Counties League seasons